Theopetra Cave is a limestone cave located in Theopetra village of Meteora municipality, Thessaly, Greece. The site has become increasingly important as human presence is attributed to all periods of the Middle and Upper Paleolithic, the Mesolithic, Neolithic and beyond, bridging the Pleistocene with the Holocene.

Description
Radiocarbon evidence shows for human presence at least 50,000 years ago. Excavations began in 1987 under the direction of Ν. Kyparissi-Apostolika, which were meant to answer questions about Paleolithic Thessaly. 

Several features of the cave indicate human occupation.

Theopetra Cave contains one of the longest archaeological sequences in Greece, comprising Middle and Upper Palaeolithic as well as Mesolithic and Neolithic cultural remains. The records have shown important palaeoenvironmental data based on sedimentary features and botanical remains.

Findings include a man-made stone wall that is still standing today, which was built in approximately 21,000 BCE. It is the oldest known example of a man-made structure. The wall is thought to have been built to protect its residents from cold winds at the height of the last ice age.

Geologically, the formation of the limestone rock has been dated to the Upper Cretaceous period, 135–65 million years BP.

Archaeogenetics
In 2016, researchers successfully extracted the DNA from the tibia of two individuals buried in Theopetra Cave. Both individuals were found in a Mesolithic burial context and separately dated to 7288–6771 BC and 7605–7529 BC. Both individuals were found to belong to mtDNA Haplogroup K1c.

Access
The cave is located just to the north, within walking distance, of the center of Theopetra village. The Theopetra Cave Museum is located in the village.

Nearby, the ruins of the Monastery of St. Theodore are located just to the south of Theopetra village, near the village of Agii Theodori (Άγιοι Θεόδωροι).

References 

Caves of Greece
Show caves in Greece
Landforms of Thessaly
Trikala (regional unit)